Dulong (simplified Chinese: 独龙语; traditional Chinese: 獨龍語; pinyin: Dúlóng) or Drung, Derung, Rawang, or Trung, is a Sino-Tibetan language in China.  Dulong is closely related to the Rawang language of Myanmar (Burma). Although almost all ethnic Derung people speak the language to some degree, most are multilingual, also speaking Burmese, Lisu, and Mandarin Chinese except for a few very elderly people.

Dulong is also called: Taron, Kiu, Qui, Kiutze, Qiuzi, Kiupa, Kiao, Metu, Melam, Tamalu, Tukiumu, Qiu, Nung, Nu-tzŭ.

Classification
Dulong belongs to the Nungish language family of the Central Tibeto-Burman branch of the Tibeto-Burman branch of the Sino-Tibetan language family. The other two languages in the same family are Anong and Rawang.

History
Dulong/Rawang is a Tibeto-Burman language cluster spoken on both sides of the China/Myanmar border just south and east of Tibet. Within Myanmar, the people who speak the Dulong language (possibly up to 100,000 people) live in northern Kachin State, particularly along the Mae Hka ('Nmai Hka) and Mali Hka (Mali Hka) River valleys. In the past, they had been called 'Hkanung' or 'Nung', and have often been considered to be a subgroup of the Kachin (Jinghpaw). Around 1950, speakers of this language in Myanmar began a movement to use the name /rəwɑŋ/ (spelled 'Rvwang' in the Rawang orthographies) to represent all of its speakers. The speakers in China, though, continue to use the name 'Dulong'.

Geographic distribution
There are 14,000 (2,000 census) people speaking in two dialects: 8,500 in Nu River dialect, and 5,500 in Dulong River dialect. The locations of Dulong are Yunnan province (Gongshan Dulong-Nu autonomous county), Xizang Autonomous Region (Chayu (Zayü) county, Chawalong Town), and Bingzhongluo. In the past, the Dulong River was known as the Kiu (Qiu) river, and the Dulong people were known as the Kiu (Qiu), Kiutze (Qiuzi), Kiupa, or Kiao.

Dialects
Dulong has two dialects: Dulong River (Central Dulongjiang, Derung River, Northern Dulongjiang, Southern Dulongjiang), and Nu River (Nujiang Dulong). Dialects reportedly inherently intelligible (Thurgood and LaPolla 2003). Other possible dialect names are Melam, Metu, Tamalu, and Tukiumu.

Phonology

Consonants
Dulong has twenty-four initial consonants at six points of articulation, plus the consonant clusters /pr, br, mr, kr, xr, gr, pl, bl, ml, kl, gl/ in initial position; only the consonants /p, t, ʔ, k, n, m, ŋ, r, l/ occur in final position.

Vowels
Dulong has seven vowels, /i, ε, ə, ɑ, ɔ, ɯ, u/, and three diphthongs, /əi, ɑi, ɯi/, which only appear in open syllables.

Tones
Dulong has 3 tones: high level, high falling, and low falling. In the Dulong language, tone has the role of differentiating the meaning of a few words, with about 8% words (out of about 4000) completely relying on tones to distinguish them.

Grammar
Words can be formed by prefixation, suffixation, or compounding. Word classes include nouns, defined by the ability to appear with a numeral classifier; verbs, defined by the ability to appear with negation and the person and tense marking; postpositions, which are enclitic to NPs, numerals, and classifiers. Adjectives are a subset of stative verbs for which reduplication means intensification or adverbialization rather than the perfective aspect (reduplication with nouns has a distributive meaning, ‘every’). Adjectives can be used as predicates or can appear nominalized in a copula clause.

The grammar of the language is documented extensively by Perlin (2019).

Verb conjugation
Derung verbs inflect fusionally for person and number and agglutinatively otherwise. Verbal conjugation uses a mix of affixes, a direct-inverse person-marking hierarchy, apophony, and tone changes.

Intransitive verbs
Intransitive verbs are conjugated to agree with the subject in person and number.

The first-person plural form is formed via vowel ablaut, primarily characterized by the lengthening of the root vowel.

Transitive verbs
Transitive verbs in Derung may agree with both agent and object in three grammatical persons (1st, 2nd, and 3rd) and three grammatical numbers (singular, dual, and plural). The persons are ranked in a direct-inverse hierarchy, with the first person ranking above the second person, and the second person itself ranking above the third person.  If this hierarchy is violated, the marked scenario prefix  is prefixed. However, second-person agents are also marked with  regardless of the hierarchy.

Vocabulary
Lexical similarity: 74% with Matwang dialect of Rawang.

References

External links
 Hammarström, Harald & Forkel, Robert & Haspelmath, Martin. 2017. Glottolog 3.0. Jena: Max Planck Institute for the Science of Human History.
 Numeral Systems of the World's Languages. 
 Drung at The Endangered Language Project.

Nungish languages
Languages of China